Antal Szentmihályi (born 13 June 1939) is a former Hungarian footballer. He played for Győri ETO, Vasas SC and Újpesti Dózsa as a goalkeeper. He played 31 games for the Hungary national football team. Szentmihályi is most famous for his participation in the gold medal-winning Hungarian team in the 1964, and for playing in the 1962 and 1966 FIFA World Cup, and the 1964 European Nations' Cup. He retired in 1977.

References

External links
Database of Hungarian Olympic Committee

1939 births
Living people
Hungarian footballers
Hungary international footballers
Olympic footballers of Hungary
Olympic gold medalists for Hungary
Olympic bronze medalists for Hungary
Olympic medalists in football
Footballers at the 1960 Summer Olympics
Footballers at the 1964 Summer Olympics
Medalists at the 1960 Summer Olympics
Medalists at the 1964 Summer Olympics
Győri ETO FC players
Újpest FC players
Vasas SC players
1962 FIFA World Cup players
1964 European Nations' Cup players
1966 FIFA World Cup players
Hungarian football managers
Expatriate football managers in Kuwait
MTK Budapest FC managers
Fehérvár FC managers
Diósgyőri VTK managers
Al Jahra SC managers
FC Tatabánya managers
Sportspeople from Győr
Association football goalkeepers
Kuwait Premier League managers
Al-Shabab SC (Kuwait) managers
Hungarian expatriate sportspeople in Kuwait
Al-Taawoun FC managers
Hungarian expatriate sportspeople in Saudi Arabia
Expatriate football managers in Saudi Arabia
Hungarian expatriate football managers
Nemzeti Bajnokság I managers